The Maple Leaf Trot is a harness race for Standardbred trotters three years of age and older. It is run at a distance of one mile at Mohawk Racetrack in Campbellville, Ontario.

Locations
Thorncliffe Park Raceway : (1950-1953)
Old Woodbine / Greenwood Raceway : (1954-1993)
Woodbine Racetrack : (1994-2001)
Mohawk Racetrack : (2002–present)

First run as the Maple Leaf Cup Trot on August 3, 1950 at Thorncliffe Park. In 1954 Standardbred the race was moved to the Old Woodbine track. Renamed the Greenwood Raceway in 1963, the race remained there until the track closed in 1993. From 1994 through 2001 Woodbine Racetrack was home to the Maple Leaf Trot after which it shifted to its present location at Mohawk Raceway.

Historical notes
The 1950 inaugural running resulted in a tie after two races were run in which Morris Mite and Adeline Hanover each ran 1-2. With no third race runoff, a coin toss was agreed to by the owners which resulted in Morris Mite receiving the winner's trophy.

Four horses have won the Maple Leaf Trot three times. Tie Silk and No Sex Please won three during a four-year timespan, however Grandpa Jim and San Pail are the only horses to win three straight editions. For Grandpa Jim's three wins from 1969 through 1971, he earned a total of $147,600 while for San Pail's three wins from 2009 through 2011, he earned a total of $2,222,500.

Records
 Most wins by a horse
3 – Tie Silk (1961, 1963, 1964) 
3 – Grandpa Jim (1969, 1970, 1971) 
3 – No Sex Please (1989, 1990, 1992)
3 – San Pail (2009, 2010, 2011)

 Most wins by a driver
 4 – Ron Waples (1984, 1989, 1990, 1992)

 Most wins by a trainer
 3 – Harold A. McKinley (1957, 1959, 1960), Howard Beissinger (1961, 1972, 1980), Robert G. Farrington (1969, 1970, 1971), Rodney Hughes (2009, 2010, 2011), Ron Waples, Jr. (1989, 1990, 1992)

 Most wins by an owner
 4 – Miron Farms (Adrien & Gerard Miron) (1961, 1962, 1963, 1964)

 Stakes record at 1 mile
 1:50 4/5 – Mister Herbie  (2012)
 1:50 4/5 – Guardian Angel AS (2019)

Winners of the Maple Leaf Trot

External links
YouTube video of San Pail winning his third consecutive Maple Leaf Trot in 2009

References

Recurring sporting events established in 1950
Harness racing in Canada
Horse races in Ontario
Mohawk Racetrack
1950 establishments in Ontario